Elizabeth Crawford is a British author, historian and dealer in suffrage ephemera. She has been called the Suffrage Detective and has written several "key works" on the history of the suffrage movement in the United Kingdom including The Women’s Suffrage Movement: A Reference Guide, Art and Suffrage: A Biographical Dictionary of Suffrage Artists, and The Women's Suffrage Movement in Britain and Ireland: A Regional Survey. 

The Reference Guide, in particular, has been termed "indispensable." Martin Pugh called the book, which includes 400 biographies and 800 entries on organizations, a "magnificent research tool and a great stimulus to professionals and amateurs alike."

References

External links 
 suffrageresources.org.uk: Elizabeth Crawford on the Women's Suffrage Campaign (podcast)

Living people
Women's suffrage in the United Kingdom
British historians
British writers